Otto Henry Schneider (8 August 1865 – 23 January 1950) was an American artist, known for his landscape and figure paintings.

Biography 
Otto Henry Schneider was born on 8 August 1865 in Muscatine, Iowa. He studied at the School of the Art Institute of Chicago, under artists John Vanderpoel and Oliver Dennett Grover. And continued his studies at the Art Students League of Buffalo, under artists Lucius Wolcott Hitchcock, John H. Twatchman, George de Forest Brush, and Harry Siddons Mowbray. Followed by study in Paris, France at the Académie Julian, under artists Marcel Baschet, François Schommer, Paul Gervais, and Henri Royer.

From 1921 to 1923, he taught at the Buffalo Academy of Fine Arts, the precursor art school to the Albright Art School (now known as the Albright–Knox Art Gallery) in Buffalo, New York.

References 

1865 births
1950 deaths
People from Muscatine, Iowa
Artists from San Diego
School of the Art Institute of Chicago alumni
Art Students' League of Buffalo alumni
Académie Julian alumni
20th-century American painters
Impressionist painters